Arlington Baths Club is a non-profit member-run swimming club in Glasgow. It is housed in a purpose-built Category A Listed Building that opened on 1 August 1871. The Arlington Baths Club was the first swimming club in Glasgow.  

The building is in the Charing Cross area and was part of the westward development of the city.  Built largely in the traditional tenement idiom, albeit with some extraordinary flourishes such as the famous Charing Cross Mansions, this area quickly attracted the well-off middle class residents who also constituted the membership of the Arlington Baths Club.

The Club was therefore created on the doorstep of its membership, the great majority of whom lived within easy walking distance. From this emerged the traditions of the Club. The membership appeared first thing in the morning before going to work and returned in the evening after work, before going home in a regular twice daily ritual.

A replica of Arlington Baths was built soon after in London, whither the drawings of the Arlington were spirited sometime towards the end of the 19th century, never to be seen again. This building was bombed during the Second World War and was never rebuilt. The building of the Arlington Baths coincided with the implementation of the first of the Public Health acts in 1870 and was considered by some to be the precursor to the growth of public bathing in the UK.

The Building

The Original Building
The building was originally designed by John Burnet, the father of Sir John James Burnet. He designed the part of the building containing the swimming pool, the senior and junior baths, and the senior changing room and smoking room, which now forms the northern part of the building.

As originally designed by Burnet, the building was single story and conceived as a kind of theme and variation on the idea of subdivision by twos and threes. Thus, the main facade onto Arlington Street was modulated by means of two pavilions, located at either end of the building with the centre marked by arched windows arranged in groups of threes. 

One entered the building at the higher level through the arched entrance in the middle of the façade, coming straight out onto the transverse axis of the pool. From this point, the emphasis of the building swung through ninety degrees onto the main axis of the pool hall along which the other accommodation was laid out. 

Burnet's intention was to create a composition organized symmetrically, that is by halves, but relieved by a sub-division by threes. 

The original building is now protected as a category A listed building.

The First Extension
Not long after the building was opened, a Turkish Suite plus ancillary accommodation was added in 1875 by Charles Drake, utilizing his pioneering poured concrete construction technique, allowing the membership to increase to six hundred.  The Turkish Suite consists of a large square room, heated to high temperatures by plenum with tiled walls and floor and a dome-shaped ceiling studded with small star-shaped windows glazed with colored glass.  There is also a fountain in the centre, no longer functioning. No talking is allowed within the space. The remainder of the Turkish Suite consists of a hot room, cool room, shampooing room and washing room. Originally, the washing room connected to the pool via a swim through. In front of the Turkish Suite, a reading room (now the members lounge), shoe hall and entrance hall were added.

The second extension
By 1893, more space was needed. Andrew Myles was employed as architect to add billiard and card rooms. This extension added another story accessed by a grand staircase, which in turn led to a junior billiard room (now reading room), senior billiard room, card room, and other administrative spaces, on the first floor Myles extended the facade up to form a space with exposed roof trusses, added glazing at the apex, and added a five windowed loggia above the entrance.

The Third Extension
In 1902, the club added a story to the street frontage of Burnet's original building. This did not extend the pool hall itself, but simply the bank of rooms which lay between the pool hall and the street.

The club hired Benjamin Conner as the archietect. He extended the front wall of the original building directly upwards to create a new larger billiard hall and dressing room now used as a gym. Exposed timber roof trusses and partial roof glazing were used in these spaces.

Since the work carried out by Conner, no further large scale additions have taken place to the fabric of the building. Numerous smaller scale alterations have taken place. Internal alterations carried out during the late 1960s and 1970s in order to comply with fire safety legislation have damaged the interior of the building.

Naturist Swimming 
Arlington Baths offers a naturist swim to those over eighteen on Sunday evenings, dubbed “The Sunday Swim”. The swim allows people who are not members of the baths to swim completely nude and make use of the baths’ Turkish suite, steam room, and saunas. Nude yoga classes are also offered.

References

External links
 
 Arlington Baths Club home site

Victorian architecture in the United Kingdom
Sports clubs established in 1871
Sports organisations of Scotland
Swimming venues in Scotland
Listed sports venues in Scotland
1871 establishments in Scotland
Category A listed buildings in Glasgow